Margarita Gil Roësset (3 March 1908 in Madrid – 28 July 1932 in Las Rozas) was a Spanish sculptor, illustrator, and poet, best remembered for her sculptures in the genres of art nouveau, symbolism, and expressionism which were successfully exhibited at the National Exhibition of Fine Arts in Spain during her lifetime.

References 

1908 births
1932 deaths
Spanish sculptors
Spanish illustrators
Spanish poets
Spanish feminists
Las Sinsombrero members